Marco Antonio Barba Mariscal (born 24 May 1970) is a Mexican politician affiliated with the PRI. He currently serves as Deputy of the LXII Legislature of the Mexican Congress representing Jalisco.

References

1970 births
Living people
Politicians from Guadalajara, Jalisco
Institutional Revolutionary Party politicians
21st-century Mexican politicians
Deputies of the LXII Legislature of Mexico
Members of the Chamber of Deputies (Mexico) for Jalisco